Schüttorf is a railway station located in Schüttorf, Germany. The station is located on the Almelo - Salzbergen railway. The train services are operated by Eurobahn.

Train services
The following services currently call at Schüttorf:
Wiehengebirgs-Bahn Bad Bentheim - Rheine - Osnabrück - Herford - Bielefeld

References

Railway stations in Lower Saxony
Railway stations on the Almelo - Salzbergen railway line